Satyajnana Tirtha was a Hindu philosopher, scholar and saint. He served as the pontiff of Shri Uttaradi Math from 1906 to 1911. He was the 37th in succession from Madhvacharya.

References

Bibliography
 

 

Madhva religious leaders
Vaishnavism
Uttaradi Math
Bhakti movement
Hindu activists
Dvaitin philosophers
Dvaita Vedanta
1911 deaths
Year of birth unknown